Bara-irnun ( bara-ir-nun) was queen of the Sumerian city-state of Umma and wife of king Gishakidu, circa 2400 BCE. She is particularly known from a gold votive plate, in which she describes her genealogy in great detail. The inscription on the plate reads:

The original royal line of Umma consisted in the filiation of Enakalle (possibly son of Ush) and his own son Ur-Lumma. When Ur-Lumma died, presumably without a son but certainly with a daughter named Bara-irnum, the throne was handed over to Il, son of Eanandu (who had no regnal title) and grandson (or nephew) of Enakalle. King Il was then succeeded by his own son Gishakidu. Bara-irnum married her cousin Gishakidu, thus re-uniting both strands of the royal family by a marital alliance.

The plaque is the first known mention of Shara, tutelary god of Umma.

References

24th-century BC women
Ancient queens consort
Sumerian people
Umma